Sam Prekop is the debut album by Sam Prekop.

Track listing
 "Showrooms" – 4:22
 "The Company" – 4:17
 "Practice Twice" – 4:06
 "A Cloud to the Back" – 3:56
 "Don't Bother" – 5:21
 "Faces and People" – 7:00
 "On Such Favors" – 3:40
 "The Shadow" – 4:48
 "Smaller Rivers" – 2:41
 "So Shy" – 5:19

Credits 
Backing vocals: Jim O'Rourke (tracks: 1 & 7)
Bass: Joshua Abrams
Cornet: Rob Mazurek
Guitar: Archer Prewitt
Organ synthesized strings, guitar, six-string bass, electric piano, slide guitar: Jim O'Rourke
Percussion: Chad Taylor
Producer: Jim O'Rourke
Triangle, maracas, tambourine: John McEntire
Violin, viola: Julie Pomerleau

References

External links 
 Rolling Stone interview: Sam Prekop Deflates Solo Offering

Sam Prekop albums
1999 debut albums
Thrill Jockey albums